Watase (written: 渡瀬) is a Japanese surname. Notable people with the surname include:

, Japanese ski jumper
, Japanese manga artist and illustrator
, Japanese writer
, Japanese actor
, Japanese ski jumper
, Japanese manga artist

Fictional characters
, protagonist of the anime series Buddy Complex
, protagonist of the anime film Children Who Chase Lost Voices
, a character in the anime series Mawaru Penguindrum

Japanese-language surnames